Marco Alessandro Sulzner (born 2 July 2003) is an Austrian footballer who plays as a defender for First Vienna on loan from LASK.

Club career
On 7 February 2022, Sulzner signed with Austrian Football Bundesliga club LASK. As LASK and Sulzner's previous club Juniors OÖ are under a cooperation agreement, he is eligible to play for either club. Sulzner made his Bundesliga debut for LASK on 19 February 2022 against Admira Wacker.

Career statistics

Club

Notes

References

2003 births
Living people
Austrian footballers
Association football defenders
LASK players
FC Juniors OÖ players
First Vienna FC players
2. Liga (Austria) players
Austrian Football Bundesliga players